A Tour For Me + You was the third concert tour by American singer Austin Mahone in support of his second mixtape, ForMe+You. The tour began in Fort Lauderdale, and concluded in Los Angeles.

Background and development
Following the release of ForMe+You, Mahone announced he would be embarking on his third headlining concert tour, visiting 22 cities around North America.

Shows

References

2017 concert tours